Ranieri Del Pace (Pisa, May 7, 1681 – February 27, 1738), also called Giovanni Batista Ranieri Del Pace, was an Italian painter of the late Baroque period, active mainly in Tuscany.

He trained under Giovanni Camillo Sagrestani. Lanzi describes him as descending into Mannerism. He painted a St Thomas Acquinas in Glory (c. 1711) for the Oratory of St Thomas Aquinas in Florence. Among other projects were the four stations, elements, and stories of Adonis for the Palazzo Capponi-Covoni. He also worked in the church of San Jacopo Sopr'Arno (1709) and Ognissanti (1721). He helped design celebratory floats to celebrated the canonization of Pope Pius V. he also painted frescoes of the stories of St Pius the Palazzo Vescovile in Prato, a Martrydom of St Sebastian for the church of Santissima Annunziata in Capannoli, a Presentation of Jesus at the temple for  the church of San Filippo Neri in Cortona, and for the church of Santi Andrea e Lucia a Ripoli, Cascina. A painting of a Ragazza che si spulcia is found in the Pinacoteca Comunale of Ravenna.

Sources
Italian Wikipedia entry

1681 births
1738 deaths
People from Pisa
17th-century Italian painters
Italian male painters
18th-century Italian painters
Painters from Tuscany
Italian Baroque painters
18th-century Italian male artists